Lee Seung-Hyun, better known as Life, is a former professional South Korean StarCraft II player. He began his career in 2011 with Team Zenex, which merged with StarTale shortly after. He later played for KT Rolster and shortly for Afreeca Freecs. At the end of his career, Life was one of the most accomplished StarCraft II players of all time with second most premier tournament wins of any StarCraft II player, including one World Championship Series title in 2014, two Global StarCraft II League (GSL) titles, one GSL Blizzard Cup title, two Major League Gaming titles, two DreamHack titles, and one Intel Extreme Masters title.

Life was arrested in 2016 for match fixing. He was convicted and sentenced to 18 months of imprisonment suspended by three years, fined  (approximately ), and received a lifetime ban from Korean esports.

Career

Early success (2011–2012) 
Life began StarCraft career at age 14 when he joined Team Zenex in March 2011. He began primarily playing in the iCCup Korean Weekly, which was later renamed to the ESV TV Korean Weekly. He won his first tournament after one month of competing, when he defeated Jung "jjakji" Ji-hoon in the final of ESV TV Korean Weekly Season 1 #6. In his first seven months of competing, he finished in the top eight, or better, nine times. Of those, he reached the finals four times and won two of them. One Life's biggest competitors at the time was Yun "TaeJa" Young-seo; throughout the Korean Weekly tournaments, TaeJa had beaten Life on five different occasions, while Life had never beaten TaeJa.

Life then began playing in the Global StarCraft II Team League (GSTL). In one of the GSTL events, Life defeated all five players from Team Liquid — an achievement known as an "All-Kill". In July 2012, Team Zenex merged with StarTale, and Life competed in the Team Liquid StarLeague. In a span of five months, Life reached second place in the Team Liquid StarLeague, losing only to Jang "Creator" Hyun Woo in the finals.

After that event, he made his Global StarCraft II League (GSL) Code S debut, the highest division of GSL, at GSL Season 4 in 2012. Life walked the Royal Road — referring when a player wins a premier Korean title the first time he qualifies to compete — that season, beating players such as Lim "NesTea" Jae Duk, Ahn "Seed" Sang-wong, Lee "MarineKing" Jung-hoon, and TaeJa along the way. In the grand finals, Life faced Jung "Mvp" Jong-hun, who had won the third most premier tournaments in StarCraft II at the time. Life won the first two games in the best-of-seven series, but Mvp won the following three. However, Life went on to win the next two and became the GSL champion. At 15 years old, he became the youngest player to ever win a GSL and the first Royal Roader in GSL history.

The following week, Life won the 2012 MLG Fall Championship in Dallas, Texas, after defeating Lee "Leenock" Dong-nyoung in the finals after starting the match down 1–3. With the win, he became the youngest player to ever win an MLG championship. However, after returning back to Korea, he was eliminated in the next GSL within two weeks. One of the next tournaments he competed in was season five of the IGN Pro League (IPL5) in Las Vegas, Nevada, which took place in November 2012. He ultimately lost to Leenock in the upper bracket of the tournament and later to Jens "Snute" Aasgaard  in the lower bracket. The GSL World Championship exhibition series, a showmatch between Team Korea and Team World, took place during IPL5, and Life played as a member of Team Korea. In the first round, he won his lone match against Johan "Naniwa" Lucchesi, as Team Korea went on to win the round. In the second round, the winner was determined by the first team to win five matches; the winner from each match goes on to play another player from the opposing team. Life was the first member of Team Korea to play, and he won four straight matches, putting Korea at match point. He lost his fifth match, against Ilyes "Stephano" Satouri. Despite Stephano going on to win three more consecutive matches, Team Korea won the event. 

The final tournament of 2012 that Life competed in was the GSL Blizzard Cup, a tournament consisting of the top Korean players from that year. After advancing past the group stage, he defeated Park "DongRaeGu" Soo-ho and Leenock in the bracket stage to advance to the finals, where he faced and Won "Parting" Lee-sak. Parting began the series by winning the first two games, but Life went on to win four consecutive matches and the tournament.

Struggles and rebound (2013) 
Lee picked up another title in early 2013 at Iron Squid 2, after rallying back from a 0–3 deficit against Park "DRG" Soo-ho in the finals. Around that time, StarCraft II: Wings of Liberty was being phased out in tournaments in favor of the new expansion StarCraft II: Heart of the Swarm. Life's final Wings of Liberty tournament was 2013 GSL Season 1, where he was eliminated in the group stage. He won his first Heart of the Swarm tournament, 2013 MLG Winter, after defeating Lee "Flash" Young-ho in the finals. The win made in the first StarCraft player to win back-to-back MLG Championship events. In April 2013, Life competed in the preliminary qualifiers for the 2013 Asian Indoor and Martial Arts Games. He defeated Flash in the qualifiers to secure a spot at the event; however, he did not attend the event due to a scheduling conflict with an upcoming MLG event.

In the first of three 2013 WCS seasons in Korea, which was hosted by GSL, Life once again fell in the group stage, marking the third straight season where did not make it past the round of 16. His finish in the event also dropped him down to the WCS Challenger League. There, Life defeated MarineKing to requalify for the next WCS season. Life continued to struggle throughout the rest of the year. In between WCS season, Life competed at DreamHack Summer 2013. In a match he was heavily favored to win there, Life lost to Jeffrey "Sjow" Brusi; following the loss, Life appeared to have lost motivation, as he began practicing the game less. He then returned to Korea for the second WCS season of the year, which was hosted by OnGameNet StarLeague (OSL). There, Life was eliminated after only two games, losing to both Jung "Fantasy" Myung-hoon and Hwang "KangHo" Kang-ho. He was once again relegated to the Challenger League, where he was defeated by Shin "hyvaa" Dae-kun in the round of 24. The early loss meant that Life would have to compete in the Up & Down matches, a qualifier tournament, in order to qualify for the next season of the WCS Code S. In the Up & Down matches, Life lost his first two matches and failed to qualify for the following season's Code S tournament.

Life's ambition seemed to return by the end of 2013, reaching the semifinals or finals at four foreign events. In September, he travelled to Bucharest, Romania, to compete in his second DreamHack event. He reached the semifinals of the event, where he lost to the eventual champion Yun "TaeJa" Young-seo. Less than a month later, Life attended Intel Extreme Masters New York 2013. After making it past the group stage, Life swept both of his opponents in the quarterfinals and semifinals to reach the finals, where he faced Naniwa. He claimed the IEM title after defeating Naniwa, 4–2. In late December, Life flew to Sweden for DreamHack Winter 2013. After advancing to the double-elimination knockout stage, he reached the upper bracket finals before losing to TaeJa. He won his lower bracket finals match against Jo "Patience" Ji-hyun to advance to the grand finals. Life finished the event in second place, after losing to TaeJa in the grand finals. Life closed out 2013 with a semifinals finish at ASUS ROG NorthCon.

World champion (2014–2016) 

At the beginning of 2014, Life qualified for Code S of GSL Season 1. He reached the semifinals of the tournament, where he lost against Eo "soO" Yoon-su. In April 2014, Life travelled to compete in DreamHack Bucharest 2014. He lost only one match in the group stage and went on to win the event after defeating Kim "Impact" Joon-hyuk in the finals. 

By the end of the year, Life had accumulated enough World Championship Points to compete at the 2014 StarCraft II World Championship Series (WCS) at BlizzCon 2014 in November. He won his first two matches of the tournament to advance to the semifinals, where he faced TaeJa, who was considered to be the strongest player left in the tournament. Life won the match in a close series and advanced to the finals against Mun "MMA" Seong-won. In a 4–1 win, he defeated MMA and won the 2014 championship. In regards to his performance prior to the WCS, Life said in a press conference, "[Last year] I had a lot of confidence in my skills, but since things didn't work out well this year, I have gotten more humble. Personally, being without that higher confidence level has been good for me. Because I can strive forward, work harder." He closed out 2014 competing at DreamHack Winter 2014, where he reached the finals, after defeating TaeJa in the semifinals. Life finished in second place at the event, losing to Park "ForGG" Ji-soo in the finals.

In January 2015, Life finished first at IEM Taipei 2015 after defeating Cho "Maru" Seong Ju, who was widely considered to be one of the best players at the time. The following month, he left StarTale and signed with KT Rolster. Life then competed in 2015 GSL Season 1: Code S, where he ultimately defeated Parting to take first place. He continued the year by finishing in the top-four at both StarCraft II StarLeague (SSL) Season 1 and the KeSPA Cup and in the top eight at SSL Season 2. However, Life seemed to have once again lost interest in the game by the end of 2015. He still had enough World Championship Point to compete at the 2015 WCS. There, Life reached the finals of the event, where he faced Kim "sOs" Yoo Jin. The best-of-seven series went back and forth, with sOs winning the first game, Life winning the second, and so on. In the end, Life lost the match, 3–4, finishing in second place.

In January 2016, Life signed with Afreeca Freecs. His career abruptly ended in 2016 after receiving a lifetime ban from all Korean esports events due to match fixing. At the end of his career, he had won the second most premier StarCraft II tournaments of any StarCraft II player.

Match fixing 
On January 29, 2016, the Korean e-Sports Association (KeSPA) released a statement that Life was under investigation by the Changwon district prosecutors office for match fixing. Three months later, on April 21, the Changwon Regional Prosecution Service special investigations division released a report confirming that Life, Jung "Bbyong" Woo-yong, and 11 financial backers and brokers had been convicted of match fixing two matches in the KeSPA Cup. He was convicted and sentenced to 18 months of imprisonment suspended by three years and fined  (approximately $58,000). He also received a lifetime ban from Korean esports. ESPN named his match fixing the most disappointing event in esports in 2016.

Accomplishments 
World Championship Series
 One-time WCS Global Finals champion – 2014

Global StarCraft II League
 Two-time GSL champion – 2012 Season Four, 2015 Season One
 One-time GSL Blizzard Cup champion – 2012

Other
 Two-time DreamHack champion – Bucharest 2014, Taipei 2015
 Two-time MLG champion – Fall 2012, Winter 2013
 One-time Iron Squid champion – 2013
 One-time IEM champion – New York 2013
 One-time IGN Pro Team League champion – 2012

Notes

References

External links 

1997 births
Living people
South Korean esports players
StarCraft players
KT Rolster players
StarTale players